William Hine (1687–1730) was an English organist and composer.

Hine was born at Brightwell, Oxfordshire. He was a chorister of Magdalen College, Oxford in 1694, and a clerk in 1705. Coming to London, he studied music under Jeremiah Clarke, whose executive style he closely imitated. In 1711 or 1712 Hine became organist of Gloucester Cathedral, and shortly afterwards married Alicia, the daughter of Abraham Rudhall, the bellfounder. The dean and chapter of Gloucester showed their appreciation of Hine's services by voluntarily increasing his yearly salary by 20 pounds, as is recorded in the mural tablet over his grave in the cloisters. He died on 28 August 1730, aged 43; his wife died on 28 June 1735. Hine's chief pupils were Richard Church and William Hayes, whose son, Dr. Philip Hayes, presented a portrait of Hine to the Oxford Music School.

After Hine's death his widow published by subscription Harmonia Sacra Glocestriensis, or Select Anthems for 1, 2, and 3 Voices, &c. The volume contains the anthems Save me, Rejoice in the Lord, O ye righteous, I will magnify Thee, and the Jubilate (with Hall's Te Deum).

References

1687 births
1730 deaths
17th-century English musicians
18th-century English people
18th-century classical musicians
17th-century classical composers
18th-century classical composers
18th-century British male musicians
English Baroque composers
English classical composers
English organists
British male organists
People from Oxfordshire
18th-century keyboardists
English male classical composers
17th-century male musicians